The 2018 United States Senate election in New Jersey  took place on November 6, 2018, in order to elect a member of the United States Senate to represent the state of New Jersey. Incumbent Democratic U.S. Senator Bob Menendez won reelection to a third term over Republican businessman Bob Hugin.

The candidate filing deadline was April 2, 2018, for Democratic and Republican candidates, and the primary election was held on June 5, 2018. The deadline for independent candidates was June 5, 2018.

Despite the race being rated as a tossup by some political pundits, including The Cook Political Report, Menendez was reelected by an 11.2% margin. However, Hugin was the first Republican Senate candidate to carry Atlantic and Gloucester counties since Clifford Case's landslide victory in 1972.

Democratic primary
While he never lost support from any major New Jersey officials, after a mistrial was declared in Senator Menendez's corruption trial, party figures across New Jersey lined up with public endorsements of his reelection bid, including the "full support" of Governor Phil Murphy. He formally declared his intention to run for reelection on March 28, 2018, alongside Governor Murphy and Senator Cory Booker.

Candidates

Nominee
 Bob Menendez, incumbent U.S. Senator

Eliminated in Primary
 Lisa McCormick, activist and candidate for Union County Clerk in 2010

Withdrew
 Michael Starr Hopkins, attorney

Declined
 Rob Andrews, former U.S. Representative
 Richard Codey, State Senator and former governor
 Rush D. Holt Jr., former U.S. Representative
 Donald Norcross, U.S. Representative
 Frank Pallone, U.S. Representative
 Stephen M. Sweeney, President of the State Senate
 Robert Torricelli, former U.S. Senator

Results

Republican primary
Bob Hugin launched his primary campaign on February 13 in Springfield. He began advertising on television two weeks later, attacking Menendez on the airwaves, and was soon considered the presumptive nominee. His opponent, Brian Goldberg, attempted to connect himself to President Donald Trump and his supporters by inserting the President's abbreviated slogan, "MAGA", into his ballot slogans and aligning himself with other pro-Trump, anti-establishment candidates. Goldberg also attacked Hugin's running mates, urging Republicans to write in the deceased Charlton Heston in primary races where a Republican congressional candidate was running unopposed. Ultimately, Hugin won overwhelmingly with a majority of votes in each of the state's 21 counties.

Candidates

Nominee
 Bob Hugin, businessman and former executive chairman of Celgene Corporation

Eliminated in Primary
 Brian D. Goldberg, businessman and candidate for the U.S. Senate in 2014

Withdrew
 Rich Pezzullo, businessman (endorsed Bob Hugin, running for NJ-6)
 Hirsh Singh, aerospace engineer and candidate for governor in 2017 (running for NJ-2)
 Dana Wefer, former chairwoman of the Hoboken Housing Authority and candidate for governor in 2017 (did not submit enough petition signatures)

Declined
 Jon Bramnick, Minority Leader of the New Jersey General Assembly (endorsed Hugin)
 Jeffrey Chiesa, former U.S. Senator
 Chris Christie, former governor
 Jack Ciattarelli, former State Assemblyman and candidate for Governor in 2017
 John Crowley, biotechnology executive
 Michael J. Doherty, state senator
 Kim Guadagno, former lieutenant governor and nominee for Governor in 2017
 Thomas Kean Jr., Minority Leader of the New Jersey Senate and nominee for the U.S. Senate in 2006
 Joe Kyrillos, former state senator and nominee for the U.S. Senate in 2012
 Tom MacArthur, U.S. Representative (endorsed Hugin)
 Alison Littell McHose, former state assemblywoman
 Bill Spadea, radio and TV show host; nominee for NJ-12 in 2004
 Jerry Watson
 Jay Webber, State Assemblyman and former Chairman of the New Jersey Republican State Committee (running for NJ-11)

Endorsements

Results

Libertarian Party

Candidates
Murray Sabrin, Ramapo College finance professor, Anisfield School of Business

Endorsements

Green Party 
 Madelyn R. Hoffman, peace activist and 1997 Green Party gubernatorial candidate

Independents

Candidates
 Tricia Flanagan (New Day NJ), consultant
 Kevin Kimple (Make it Simple), small business owner
 Natalie Rivera (For the People), social services coordinator
 Hank Schroeder (Economic Growth), perennial candidate

Withdrew
Muhammad Usman

General election

Debates
Complete video of debate, October 24, 2018

Fundraising

Predictions 

^Highest rating given

Polling

Kean vs. Andrews

Codey vs. Kyrillos

Results

Results by county

Counties that flipped from Democratic to Republican
 Atlantic (largest municipality: Egg Harbor Township)
 Gloucester (largest municipality: Washington Township)
 Salem (largest municipality: Pennsville Township)

Results by congressional district
Menendez won 6 of 12 congressional districts. Hugin, however, won the remaining 6, including five held by Democrats.

References

External links
Candidates at Vote Smart
Candidates at Ballotpedia
Campaign finance at FEC
Campaign finance at OpenSecrets

Official campaign websites
Tricia Flanagan (I) for Senate
Madelyn Hoffman (G) for Senate
Bob Hugin (R) for Senate
Kevin Kimple (I) for Senate
Bob Menendez (D) for Senate
Murray Sabrin (L) for Senate

2018
New Jersey
United States Senate